Balša Radunović  (born August 5, 1980) is a retired professional Montenegrin basketball player. Standing at 2.06 m (6'10"), he played the forward-center position.

References 

1980 births
Living people
AEK B.C. players
AEL Limassol B.C. players
APOEL B.C. players
BCM Gravelines players
Centers (basketball)
KK Budućnost players
KK Mornar Bar players
Montenegrin men's basketball players
Sportspeople from Podgorica
Power forwards (basketball)